Amy J. Cheng (b. 1970) is a Singaporean actress and creative director of ACT 3 Theatrics.  She is best known for her role as Karen Tay in the  television series Growing Up and as Jacqueline Ling in the 2018 romantic comedy-drama Crazy Rich Asians.

Career

Stage 
Cheng is a co-founder and creative director of Act 3 Theatrics. She has performed in live theatre shows through Act 3 including Footsteps in the Night, 41 Hours, and Confessions of the Three Unmarried Women. She has had other stage roles in Singapore Repertory Theatre's Forbidden City and The Good Citizen and Escape Productions' The Deap Blue Sea and Esplanade's Letters from Home. In 2006 she was nominated for Best Supporting Actress at the Life! Theatre Awards for her role as the Banana Tree Spirit in the mandarin musical 10 Brothers.

Television 
From 1996 until 2001 Cheng was a regular cast member of the Singaporean television drama Growing Up (1996 - 2001) as Karen Tay, the wife of Andrew Seow's character, Gary Tay. In 2001 she was nominated for Best Actress at the Asian Television Awards for her role in Growing Up. She played Dr. Winnie Leong in the television series First Touch (2002 - 2003) and also had roles in Like My Own, Happily Ever After (2007), Machine, Stay, and Anita's Complaint. Cheng has worked as a television presenter and host for My Perfect Child and The Good Life. She landed roles in the Chinese dramas She's the One, Destiny, and Making Miracles (2007). She had a guest role in the German television movie
Perfect Harmony. She played the leading role in Zhao Wei Films' Stories About Love and starred alongside Fann Wong in Jack Neo's Just Follow Law (2007). She had a small role as Felicia Chin's mother in the television movie Hong Bao + Kisses.

Film 
In 2018 she appeared in the American romantic comedy-drama film Crazy Rich Asians as Jaqueline Ling.

Filmography

Television

Film

Personal life 
In 2005, Cheng married to Rama Chandran. They have 2 children, Joshua and Jivan.

References

External links 
 

Living people
21st-century Singaporean actresses
Art directors
Singaporean film actresses
Singaporean stage actresses
Singaporean television actresses
Singaporean people of Chinese descent
Date of birth unknown
Women graphic designers
1968 births
Singaporean women television presenters